The 1977 Masters Tournament was the 41st Masters Tournament, held April 7–10 at Augusta National Golf Club in Augusta, Georgia.

Tom Watson, age 27, won the first of his two green jackets, two strokes ahead of runner-up Jack Nicklaus. The two were tied after 68 holes, then Watson birdied the par-4 17th. Needing a birdie to tie, Nicklaus bogeyed the final hole, one of 19 times in his career that he was the runner-up in a major championship. It was the second of Watson's eight major championships, and he won a second Masters in 1981.

The pair again dueled for a major title in the final round in July in Scotland, at the Open Championship at Turnberry, also won by Watson.

Although he had won a major in 1975 and led the PGA Tour in season earnings entering this Masters, Watson had been labeled a "choker" early in his pro career, known for relinquishing leads in the final round of majors and regular events. Notable among these was the U.S. Open in 1974 at Winged Foot; his win here and in Scotland put that to rest.

Field
1. Masters champions
Tommy Aaron, George Archer (11), Gay Brewer (8), Billy Casper (8,12), Charles Coody (8,10), Raymond Floyd (8,9,10,12), Doug Ford, Bob Goalby, Jack Nicklaus (2,4,8,9,10,11,12), Arnold Palmer, Gary Player (3,4), Sam Snead, Art Wall Jr.
Jack Burke Jr., Jimmy Demaret, Ralph Guldahl, Claude Harmon, Ben Hogan, Herman Keiser, Cary Middlecoff, Byron Nelson, Henry Picard, and Gene Sarazen did not play.

The following categories only apply to Americans

2. U.S. Open champions (last five years)
Lou Graham (8,12), Hale Irwin (8,12), Johnny Miller (3,8,9,12), Jerry Pate (9,10,11)

3. The Open champions (last five years)
Tom Watson (9,11), Tom Weiskopf (8,9,10,12)

Lee Trevino (4,11,12) was recovering from back surgery and did not play

4. PGA champions (last five years)
Dave Stockton (10)

5. 1976 U.S. Amateur semi-finalists
James T. Mason (a), Cary Parker Moore Jr. (a), Bill Sander (6,7,a), Stan Souza (a)

6. Previous two U.S. Amateur and Amateur champions
Vinny Giles (a), Fred Ridley (7,a), Dick Siderowf (7,a)

7. Members of the 1976 U.S. Eisenhower Trophy team
John Fought (a)

8. Top 24 players and ties from the 1976 Masters Tournament
Buddy Allin (11), Jim Colbert, Ben Crenshaw (9,10,11), Al Geiberger (9,11,12), Hubert Green (9), Dave Hill (11), Tom Kite (11), Gene Littler (12), Roger Maltbie (11), Rik Massengale (11), Jerry McGee (10), Curtis Strange, Larry Ziegler (11)

9. Top 16 players and ties from the 1976 U.S. Open
Butch Baird (11), Rod Funseth, Mark Hayes (11), Don January (10,11), Lyn Lott, Mike Morley, Andy North, J. C. Snead (11,12)

John Mahaffey was injured and did not play

10. Top eight players and ties from 1976 PGA Championship
Gil Morgan, John Schlee

11. Winners of PGA Tour events since the previous Masters
Andy Bean, Woody Blackburn, Danny Edwards, Lee Elder, Gibby Gilbert, Joe Inman, Gary Koch, Billy Kratzert, Bruce Lietzke, Mac McLendon, Tom Purtzer, Bob Wynn

Blackburn and Kratzert were the winners of the Walt Disney World National Team Championship. Subsequent winners of this pairs event did not receive an invitation.

12. Members of the U.S. 1975 Ryder Cup team
Bob Murphy

13. Foreign invitations
Isao Aoki, Seve Ballesteros, Bruce Devlin (8), David Graham (10,11), Dale Hayes (8), Tommy Horton, John Lister (11), Graham Marsh (8,11), Takashi Murakami, Jack Newton, Christy O'Connor Jnr, Peter Oosterhuis (8), Bob Shearer

Numbers in brackets indicate categories that the player would have qualified under had they been American.

Round summaries

First round
Thursday, April 7, 1977

Source:

Second round
Friday, April 8, 1977

Source:

Third round
Saturday, April 9, 1977

Source:

Final round
Sunday, April 10, 1977

Final leaderboard

Sources:

Scorecard

Cumulative tournament scores, relative to par

Source:

References

External links
Masters.com – past winners
Augusta.com – 1977 Masters leaderboard and scorecards

1977
1977 in golf
1977 in American sports
1977 in sports in Georgia (U.S. state)
April 1977 sports events in the United States